The 1970 Individual Long Track European Championship was the 14th edition of the Long Track European Championship. The final was held on 30 August 1970 in Scheeßel, West Germany.

The title was won by Jon Ødegaard of Norway. It was the last time it would be known as the European Championship because as from 1971 it was opened to riders of all nations and became the World Long Track Championship.

Venues
Qualifying round 1 - Straubing, 1 May, 1970
Final - Scheeßel - 30 August 1970

Final Classification

References 

Motor
Motor
International sports competitions hosted by West Germany